The Karkku railway station is located in the village of Karkku in the town of Sastamala, Finland. The station is located about 43 kilometres from the Tampere railway station and about 92 kilometres from the Pori railway station. Nowadays, the station is unmanned, and the track is controlled remotely from Tampere. The station is served by all InterCity trains that travel between Tampere and Pori.

Railway stations in Pirkanmaa